Zanha africana, the velvet-fruited zanha, is a species of fruit plant from the family Sapindaceae which can be found in Angola, Kenya, Mozambique, Zimbabwe, and the Democratic Republic of the Congo where it is used in door frames and tool handles. It is also used for flooring and for creating toys, railway sleepers, turnery,  furniture and ship designs.

Description
The ovary is absent in the male of the species while females bear flowers which turn into  by  fruit that is hairy and ellipsoid.

References

Dodonaeoideae
Flora of Africa